Örjan Sandred (born June 15, 1964) is a Swedish composer and is a Professor in Composition at the Marcel A. Desautels Faculty of Music at the University of Manitoba in Canada.

Biography 
Sandred studied composition at the Royal College of Music in Stockholm, McGill University (Montreal) and at IRCAM  
(Paris). Among his teachers are Sven-David Sandström, Pär Lindgren, Magnus Lindberg, Daniel Börtz, Bill Brunson and Bruce Mather.

Sandred was teaching composition at the Royal College of Music in Stockholm for 1998–2005 and he has been a guest lecturer at IRCAM, Conservatoire National Superieur de Musique in Paris, at the Bartok Seminar in Szombathely in Hungary, at the Sibelius Academy in Helsinki, at McGill University in Montreal, at Harvard University, at the Shanghai Conservatory of Music and other places. He is currently teaching and composing in Winnipeg, Manitoba.

Composition
Many of Sandred's compositions are the result of his search for new methods of composition. These methods use computerized rule-based systems (a sub-branch of 
artificial intelligence) to formalize the musical structure.

In 2009 the CD Cracks and Corrosion, featuring five of Sandred's compositions, was released on the Navona Records label.

References

External links
Örjan Sandred's homepage
Biography at the Swedish Music Information Centre
Biography at the University of Manitoba
List of works at the Swedish Music Information Centre

Swedish composers
Swedish male composers
McGill University alumni
Academic staff of McGill University
Harvard University faculty
Academic staff of the University of Manitoba
Academic staff of the Conservatoire de Paris
1964 births
Living people